Biryubash (Böröbaş; , Pürömučaš) is a rural locality (a village) in Novotroitsky Selsoviet, Mishkinsky District, Bashkortostan, Russia. The population was 378 as of 2010. There are 3 streets.

Geography 
Biryubash is located 27 km northeast of Mishkino (the district's administrative centre) by road. Refandy is the nearest rural locality.

References 

Rural localities in Mishkinsky District